Nikolaos Platon (Greek , Anglicised Nicolas Platon;  – ) was a renowned Greek archaeologist. He discovered the Minoan palace of Zakros on Crete.

He put forward one of the two systems of relative Minoan chronology used by archaeologists for Minoan archaeology. It is based on the development of the architectural complexes known as "palaces" at Knossos, Phaistos, Malia, and Kato Zakros, and divides the Minoan period into Prepalatial, Protopalatial, Neopalatial, and Post-palatial periods. The other system is based on pottery styles, as suggested by Arthur Evans.

1909 births
1992 deaths
Greek archaeologists
National and Kapodistrian University of Athens alumni
People from Cephalonia
Minoan archaeologists
École pratique des hautes études alumni
Academic staff of the Aristotle University of Thessaloniki
20th-century archaeologists